Lester Cook and David Martin were the defending champions, but chose to not compete this year.
Rik de Voest and Izak van der Merwe won in the final 4–6, 6–4, [10–7], against Nicholas Monroe and Donald Young.

Seeds

Draw

Draw

External links
 Main Draw
 Qualifying Draw

Natomas Men's Professional Tennis Tournament - Doubles
2011 Doubles